State Road 467 (NM 467) is a  state highway in the US state of New Mexico. NM 467's southern terminus is at U.S. Route 70 (US 70) north of Portales, and the northern terminus is at US 60 and US 84 west of Clovis.

Major intersections

See also

References

467
Transportation in Roosevelt County, New Mexico
Transportation in Curry County, New Mexico